Daniela Reina (born 15 May 1981 in Camerino) is an Italian former sprinter (200 m and 400 m) and middle distance runner (800 m).

In her career she won 8 times the national championships. She has 25 caps in the Italy national athletics team.

National records
 400 metres: 51.18 (Rieti, 17 August 2006) - record holder until 2 July 2009

International competitions

National titles
Daniela Reina has won 8 times the individual national championship.
4 wins in the 400 metres (2005, 2006, 2007, 2008)
4 wins in the 400 metres indoor (2006, 2007, 2008, 2009)

See also
Italian all-time top lists - 400 metres
Italian all-time top lists - 800 metres

References

External links
 

1981 births
Living people
People from Camerino
Italian female sprinters
Italian female middle-distance runners
Mediterranean Games silver medalists for Italy
Athletes (track and field) at the 2001 Mediterranean Games
Athletes (track and field) at the 2009 Mediterranean Games
World Athletics Championships athletes for Italy
Mediterranean Games medalists in athletics
Sportspeople from the Province of Macerata
20th-century Italian women
21st-century Italian women